Events from the year 1855 in Denmark.

Incumbents
 Monarch – Frederick VII
 Prime minister – Peter Georg Bang

Events

 31 October  Gads Forlag is founded by Gottlieb Ernst Clausen Gad.
 18 November  Sødring & Co. is founded by Christopher Hansen Sødring and Frederik Marchus, Count Knuth til Knuthenborg.
 27 September  A vote in Folketinget concerning the so-called fællesforfatning.

Births
 17 January  Alfred Benzon, pharmacist (died 1922)
 22 March – Karl Madsen, art historian, painter and arts administrator (died 1938)
 16 October – Carl Andreas Koefoed, agronomist (died 1948)
 12 October – Charlotte Norrie, nurse and women's rights activist (died 1940)
 20 October – Poul Simon Christiansen, painter and church decorator (died 1933)

Deaths
 11 November - Søren Kirkegaard, philosopher

References

 
1850s in Denmark
Denmark
Years of the 19th century in Denmark